Anay Goswamy  (born 16 August 1977) is an Indian Cinematographer. He is a graduate from the Government College of Arts, Chandigarh  and Film and Television Institute of India.

Filmography
{| class="wikitable"
! Movie
! Year
! Language
! Notes
|-
| 2005
| Chauras Chand 
| Hindi
| Short film
|-
| 2006 
| Chabiwali Pocket Watch
| Hindi
| Short film
|-
| rowspan="2" |2008
| Dil Kabaddi
| Hindi
|
|- 
| Mumbai Cutting
| Hindi
|
|-
| 2010
| The Japanese Wife
| Bengali
| 
|-
| 2011
| No One Killed Jessica
| Hindi
|
|-
| 2013
| Kai Po Che| Hindi
|
|-
| 2016
| Fitoor| Hindi
|
|-
| rowspan="2" |2017
| Mom| Hindi
|
|-
| Qaidi Band| Hindi
|
|-
| 2019
| Super 30| Hindi
| 
|-
| 2022
| Shamshera| Hindi
|
|-
|}

Awards and nominations
 Won Star Entertainment Award for Best Cinematography for The Japanese Wife
 Won Best Cinematography award in the 'Emerging Filmmakers' section at Cannes Film Festival for Chabiwali Pocket Watch'' (2006) 
 Won Kodak Award (Asia Pacific region) for Chabiwali Pocket Watch

References

 https://web.archive.org/web/20101015055953/http://www.mastimovies.in/2010/06/the-japanese-wife-now-an-award-winning-love-poem/
 http://www.tribuneindia.com/2010/20100708/ttlife1.htm
 https://web.archive.org/web/20110723085639/http://motion.kodak.com/motion/uploadedFiles/japaneseWife.pdf

External links
 

1977 births
Living people
Hindi film cinematographers
Film and Television Institute of India alumni
Artists from Chandigarh